Melvin M. Webber (Hartford, Connecticut, May 6, 1920 – Berkeley, November 25, 2006) was an urban designer and theorist associated for most of his career with the University of California at Berkeley but whose work was internationally important. He was a director of the university's Transportation Center, an author of classic theoretical papers and of major consulting reports, and an active contributor to debates on transportation policy, regional development and planning theory.

His most important work was in the 1960s & 1970s when he pioneered thinking about cities of the future, adapted for the age of telecommunications and mass automotive mobility. These would not be concentric clusters as in the past but urban-associational areas. Webber's 1964 paper Urban Place and the Non-Place Urban Realm set the terms for much of his later work and introduced the idea of 'community without propinquity': cities that were clusters of settlements with the urban realm of its occupants being determined by social links and economic networks in a 'Non-Place Urban Realm'. His 1974 article Permissive Planning developed the idea that urbanists should be enablers not designers or controllers, using an engineering approach to solving urban planning issues. In that paper he criticised urban designers for internalising 'the concepts and methods of design from civil engineering and architecture'.

Webber was also well known for his collaboration with Berkeley colleague, Horst Rittel in their seminal paper in 1973 on wicked problems, ones that defied ready solution by the straightforward application of scientific rationality.

He was later involved in the development of public transport, apparently regretting the car-focussed implications of his early work, though his theories are as applicable to transport planning as a car based approach to urbanism.  One of the most developed examples of his ideas is the design for Milton Keynes, a new city in England, built on a devolved and radical grid plan from 1967, where the Chief Architect (Derek Walker) described Webber as "the father of the city".

Publications
 Rittel, H.W.J. & M.M. Webber. 1973. "Dilemmas in a General Theory of Planning." Policy Sciences 4(2):155–169

See also
 History of Milton Keynes#Milton Keynes Development Corporation: designing a city for 250,000 people

References

External links
 Obituary from The Guardian

1920 births
2006 deaths
American urban planners
History of Milton Keynes
University of California, Berkeley people
Urban designers